Berdewadi dam, is an earthfill dam on local river near Lanja, Ratnagiri district in the state of Maharashtra in India.

Specifications

Purpose
 Irrigation

See also
 Dams in Maharashtra
 List of reservoirs and dams in India

References

Dams in Ratnagiri district
Dams completed in 2001
2001 establishments in Maharashtra